Lyubov Eduardovna Sobol (née Fedenyova, ; born 13 September 1987) is a Russian opposition politician, lawyer and a member of the Russian Opposition Coordination Council (2012–2013). She produces the YouTube channel "Navalny Live" of Alexei Navalny. Sobol was a lawyer of the Anti-Corruption Foundation until its closure in 2021.

Early life and education
Sobol was born on 13 September 1987 in Lobnya, Moscow Oblast, Russian SFSR. In 2004, she graduated from the gymnasium class of a secondary school with a silver medal, and entered the Institute of Jurisprudence of the State Law Academy in Moscow. In parallel with her studies, she worked in the Presnensky District Court of Moscow as secretary of the court session and as an assistant to the judge. In 2006, she entered the Law Faculty of the Moscow State University graduating with honours in 2011.

Politics and activism 
In 2011 and 2012, she took part in various forms of civil-political activities, in opposition rallies, volunteer movement in Astrakhan and assistance to Krymsk, she was an observer at various levels of elections. Since March 2011, she has been a lawyer of the RosPil Project created by Alexei Navalny to fight corruption in the area of budget spending.

That same year, Forbes Russian language edition awarded Lyubov Sobol seventh place in their 2011 ranking of "faces few know", recognising the year's most influential but still relatively unknown personalities. On 22 October 2012, she was elected on the civil list to the Russian Opposition Coordination Council, receiving 25,270 votes on the civil list and taking the fifteenth place, ahead of such famous politicians as Boris Nemtsov and Sergey Udaltsov.

In March 2016, she announced her intention to run for election to the 7th convocation of the State Duma in the fall of 2016 from the majority district in the Central Administrative District of Moscow. On 24 May, she withdrew her candidacy.

In May 2018, she became a member of the Central Council of Alexei Navalny's political party Russia of the Future. In 2019, she again took part in the campaign for the election to the Moscow City Duma. On 2 September, she was detained by police after a protest on the weekend in Moscow.

She was included in the Leadership category by the BBC on its 2019 list of 100 inspiring and influential women from around the world.

On 21 December 2020, Sobol went to knock on the door of alleged FSB agent Konstantin Kudryavtsev (who had recently provided details about the poisoning of Alexei Navalny) but was detained by police for more than six hours. On 25 December 2020, Russian authorities raided Sobol's home, detained her, and opened a criminal investigation, alleging she had made an unlawful threat. Sobol has denied the charges. If convicted, Sobol could face two to five years in prison.

On 23 January 2021 during a protest in Moscow opposing the arrest of Navalny, Sobol was grabbed and pulled away from an interview with reporters by multiple police officers. On 3 August 2021, she was convicted of COVID-19 restrictions violations and sentenced to one year and a half of parole-like restrictions. Sobol calls the convictions as politically-motivated and nonsensical. The Russian police put out an arrest warrant for Sobol in October 2021.

Personal life 
On 8 August 2021, Sobol announced that she had divorced her husband. On the same day, Russian media outlets reported that she had left Russia, having taken a flight from Moscow’s Vnukovo Airport to Turkey.

References

External links
 Роспил — Любовь Соболь
 
 Lyubov Sobol: The woman driving Russia's opposition protests, BBC Reel, 20 November 2019
 Russian Protesters Threatened With Jail Sentences On Eve Of Planned Rally In Moscow
 RFE/RL coverage, including video of 25 December 2020 raid

1987 births
Living people
21st-century jurists
21st-century Russian women politicians
People from Lobnya
Kutafin Moscow State Law University alumni
Moscow State University alumni
Alexei Navalny
Anti-Corruption Foundation
BBC 100 Women
Russian activists
Russian dissidents
Lawyers from Moscow
Russian liberals
Russian YouTubers
Russian whistleblowers
Russian activists against the 2022 Russian invasion of Ukraine
Political prisoners according to Memorial
People listed in Russia as media foreign agents
Fugitives wanted by Russia